Denies the Day's Demise is a studio album by American electronic music producer Daedelus. It was released on Mush Records and Ninja Tune in 2006.

Critical reception
At Metacritic, which assigns a weighted average score out of 100 to reviews from mainstream critics, the album received an average score of 80% based on 12 reviews, indicating "generally favorable reviews".

Tim Sendra of AllMusic gave the album 4.5 stars out of 5, praising the record's "inventive samples drawn from unique and obscure sources" and "seriously good songcraft."

Track listing

References

Further reading

External links
 

2006 albums
Daedelus (musician) albums
Mush Records albums
Ninja Tune albums